Mark Ryden (born January 20, 1963) is an American painter who is considered to be part of the Lowbrow (or Pop Surrealist) art movement. He was dubbed "the god-father of pop surrealism" by Interview magazine. Artnet named Ryden and his wife, the painter Marion Peck, the King and Queen of Pop Surrealism and one of the ten most important art couples in Los Angeles.

Ryden's aesthetic is developed from subtle amalgams of many sources, from Ingres, David and other French classicists to Little Golden Books. Ryden also draws his inspiration from anything that will evoke mystery: old toys, anatomical models, stuffed animals, skeletons and religious ephemera found in flea markets. He designed artwork for prominent musicians including Aerosmith's "Love in an Elevator", Michael Jackson's Dangerous (1991) and Red Hot Chili Peppers' One Hot Minute (1995).

Biography

Early life
Ryden was born in Medford, Oregon on January 20, 1963, to Barbara and Keith Ryden, and was raised in Southern California. His father was a painter who also restored and customized cars. He has two sisters and two brothers: his brother Keyth is also an artist and works under the name KRK. Ryden graduated from the Art Center College of Design in Pasadena in 1987.

Early career (1988–1998)
From 1988 to 1998, Ryden worked as a commercial artist. During this period, he created album covers for prominent musicians, including Danger Danger’s debut album Danger Danger; Warrant's debut album Dirty Rotten Filthy Stinking Rich; Michael Jackson's Dangerous; the 4 Non Blondes' Bigger, Better, Faster, More!; the Red Hot Chili Peppers' One Hot Minute; Scarling.’s Sweet Heart Dealer and their alternative vinyl cover of So Long, Scarecrow; Jack Off Jill's Clear Hearts Grey Flowers; the Screaming Trees' Uncle Anesthesia; Marcy Playground's Shapeshifter; and Aerosmith's Love in an Elevator. He also created book covers, including the Stephen King novels Desperation and The Regulators. He continued to do so until his work was taken up by Robert Williams, a former member of the Zap Comix collective, who in 1994 put it on the cover of Juxtapoz, a magazine devoted to "lowbrow art".

Exhibitions and major projects (1998–present)

The Meat Show 

Ryden's solo debut show entitled "The Meat Show" was in Pasadena, California in 1998.  Meat is a recurring theme in his work. He observes the disconnect in our contemporary culture between meat we use for food and the living, breathing creature it comes from. "I suppose it is this contradiction that brings me to return to meat in my art." According to Ryden, meat is the physical substance that makes all of us alive and through which we exist in this reality. All of us are wearing our bodies, which are like a garment of meat.

Wondertoonel 

A midcareer retrospective, "Wondertoonel," which refers to a cabinet of curiosities or Wunderkammer ("wonder-room"), was co-organized in 2004 by the Frye Museum in Seattle and the Pasadena Museum of California Art. It was the best attended exhibition since the Frye Art Museum opened in 1952, and also broke attendance records in Pasadena. Debra Byrne, curator at the Frye at the time of Ryden's exhibition, placed Ryden's work in the camp of the carnivalesquea strain of visual culture rooted in such works as Hieronymous Bosch’s Garden of Earthly Delights. According to the Russian author and literary critic Mikhail Bakhtin (1895–1975), there are three forms of carnivalesque artthe ritualized spectacle, the comic composition and various genres of billingsgate (foul language)all three of which are interwoven in Ryden's work.

The Tree Show 

In 2007, "The Tree Show" opened at the Michael Kohn Gallery, Los Angeles.  In this show Ryden explores the modern human experience of nature. Ryden explains, "Some people look at these massive trees and feel a sort of spiritual awe looking at them, and then other people just want to cut them up and sell them, they only see a commodity".  Ryden has created limited editions of his art to raise money for the Sierra Club and Nature Conservancy.

The Snow Yak Show 
In 2009, Ryden's exhibition "The Snow Yak Show" was shown at the Tomio Koyama Gallery in Tokyo. In this exhibition his compositions were more serene and suggestive of solitude, peacefulness and introspection.

The Gay 90s: Olde Tyme Art Show 

In 2010, "The Gay 90s: Olde Tyme Art Show" debuted at Paul Kasmin Gallery in New York. The central theme of the show referenced the idealism and sentimentalism of the 1890s while addressing the role of kitsch and nostalgia in our current culture. Here Ryden explores the line between attraction and repulsion to kitsch. According to The New York Times, "Ryden’s pictures hint at the psychic stuff that pullulates beneath the sentimental, nostalgic and naïve surface of modern kitsch."

The Tree of Life 
Ryden's The Tree of Life painting was included in the exhibition "The Artist's Museum, Los Angeles Artists 1980-2010"  at The Museum of Contemporary Art, Los Angeles (MOCA). The exhibition showcased artists who have helped shape the artistic dialogue in Los Angeles since the founding of MOCA over 30 years ago. Ryden hung on the same wall as Robert Williams.

The Gay Nineties Olde Tyme Music 
On May 13, 2014, Ryden released an album entitled The Gay Nineties Olde Tyme Music: Daisy Bell, featuring Tyler, the Creator, "Weird Al" Yankovic, Katy Perry, Stan Ridgway of Wall Of Voodoo, Danny Elfman, Mark Mothersbaugh of Devo, Nick Cave, Scarling., Kirk Hammett of Metallica, and Everlast, all giving a different rendition of the same song, "Daisy Bell (Bicycle Built for Two)." The proceeds from the signed and limited edition record benefited Little Kids Rock, a nonprofit that supports musical education in disadvantaged elementary schools.

Whipped Cream 
A two-act ballet titled Whipped Cream premiered at the Segerstrom Center for the Arts in Costa Mesa, California, in March 2017, for which Ryden developed costumes and sets. The ballet was created by world-renowned choreographer Alexei Ratmansky for the American Ballet Theatre. It is a story about a young boy who overindulges at a Vienna pastry shop and falls into a surreal delirium. With libretto and music by Richard Strauss, the ballet, originally titled Schlagobers, was first performed by the Vienna State Opera in 1924.

Selected solo exhibitions
2016/2017: "Cámara de las Maravillas." CAC, Málaga, España
2014: "The Gay 90's West."  Michael Kohn Gallery, Los Angeles
2010: "The Gay 90's: Old Tyme Art Show", Paul Kasmin Gallery, New York
2010: "The Artist's Museum," The Museum of Contemporary Art, Los Angeles
2009: "The Snow Yak Show", Tomio Koyama Gallery, Japan
2007: "Tree Show", Michael Kohn Gallery, Los Angeles
2004-05: "Wondertoonel", Frye Museum, Seattle & Pasadena Museum of California Art, Pasadena
2003: "Insalata Mista", Mondo Bizzarro Gallery, Bologna, Italy
2003: "Blood" Earl McGrath Gallery, Los Angeles, California
2002: "Bunnies and Bees", Grand Central Art Center, Santa Ana, California
2001: "Bunnies and Bees", Earl McGrath Gallery, New York, New York
1998: "The Meat Show", Mendenhall Gallery, Pasadena, California

Albums
2014: Mark Ryden's The Gay Nineties Old Tyme Music: Daisy Bell

Personal life
Ryden has two children, Rosie and Jasper. In 2009 he married artist Marion Peck in the Pacific Northwest rainforest. He currently lives in Portland, Oregon.

References

External links
 

People from Medford, Oregon
1963 births
Living people
Fantastic art
Painters from California
Painters from Oregon
Art Center College of Design alumni
20th-century American painters
American male painters
21st-century American painters
Sympathy for the Record Industry artists
Album-cover and concert-poster artists
American surrealist artists
20th-century American male artists